Hook 'Em is the costumed mascot of The University of Texas at Austin's athletics teams. Hook 'Em can be seen on the sidelines of Darrell K Royal–Texas Memorial Stadium during football games, and also at the Moody Center during basketball games. He can also be requested to appear at an event through the Texas Athletics website.

History
As the 1976 football season came to a close, it was decided by university officials that the school needed a costumed mascot as this was easier to transport to events than a live longhorn. 

Hook 'Em made his first appearance on November 29, 1977 when the men's basketball team hosted their rival University of Oklahoma at the Frank Erwin Center. The Longhorns beat the Sooners, in that game and ended the season winning the NIT championship. 

Hook 'Em has been an important part of game day ever since. Hook 'Em attends more than 1,000 University of Texas at Austin events at home and across the country each season. In 2014 the Hook 'Em costume was updated to include lighter horns, more defined muscles, and custom made football, basketball, and baseball uniforms.

Notable appearances
 
Hook 'Em attends nearly all Texas Longhorns games in all sports. In 2015 he appeared at the Texas men's basketball opener against the University of Washington in Shanghai, China. In 2016, he attended the East Lake Cup in Atlanta in support of Texas men's golf.

Hook 'Em is also a friend to San Antonio Spurs mascot, the Coyote, and appeared alongside him during the Spurs' University of Texas Spirit Night.

Hook 'Em has also appeared at many non-school affiliated events. Hook 'Em attended the Austin City Limits music festival in 2014 to perform with musician Trombone Shorty, and in 2016 to perform with electronic music group Major Lazer. Hook 'Em also attended the 2015 Country Music Awards. He was featured in Brad Paisley's music video for “Country Nation”.

National competitions

Mascot National Championship
In 2016 Hook 'Em placed 4th in his first UCA Mascot National Championship, beating out his rival, Boomer, the mascot for the University of Oklahoma. Boomer placed 7th.

Steamboat Mascot Stampede
Hook 'Em has been invited to compete in Steamboat Mascot Stampede every year since 2015. The competition is sponsored by former Phillie Phanatic David Raymond. Competing mascots come from various conferences around the nation, including the Big 12 Conference, Southeastern Conference, Big Ten Conference, Pac-12 Conference, and several other smaller schools.

Gallery

References

Big 12 Conference mascots
Texas Longhorns